A shabrack or shabraque is a saddlecloth, formerly used by European light cavalry.

The shabraque was an accoutrement of the hussar cavalry, based on the Hungarian horsemen in Austrian service who were widely imitated in European armies in the 18th and 19th centuries. The shabraque was a large cloth which in its original form, covered the Hungarian-style saddle, and was itself surmounted by a sheep or goat skin. The corners of the shabraque were rounded at the front and elongated into long points at the rear. It could be elaborately decorated with a contrasting border and a royal cypher or regimental crest. It was often discarded while on active service and by the start of the 20th century, was confined to ceremonial use; in the British Army, it is used by the Household Cavalry and by General Staff officers.

See also
 Caparison

Sources and references

Cavalry
Saddles
Turkish words and phrases